The fifth and final series of the Australian drama Sea Patrol began airing as Sea Patrol 5: Damage Control on 26 April 2011. The Nine Network has confirmed that series 5, which comprised comprise thirteen episodes each with a stand-alone story, would be the last series of Sea Patrol, due to a reliance of government rebates which expired after 68 episodes.

Casting

Main Cast.      Chris  |   Yc

Recurring cast

Episodes 
{| class="wikitable plainrowheaders" width="100%" style="margin-right: 0;"
|-
! style="background-color: #71AC37; color:black;"| Seriesepisode 
! style="background-color: #71AC37; color:black;"| Seasonepisode 
! style="background-color: #71AC37; color:black;"| Title
! style="background-color: #71AC37; color:black;"| Directed by
! style="background-color: #71AC37; color:black;"| Written by
! style="background-color: #71AC37; color:black;"| Original air date
! style="background-color: #71AC37; color:black;"| Viewers(millions)

|}

See also

 List of Sea Patrol episodes

References

General references

External links 

2011 Australian television seasons
Sea Patrol